Saoud Nasser (Arabic:سعود ناصر) (born 1 January 1990) is a Qatari footballer. He currently plays for Al-Shamal as a left back.

External links
 

Qatari footballers
1990 births
Living people
Al-Arabi SC (Qatar) players
Mesaimeer SC players
Al Kharaitiyat SC players
Al-Shamal SC players
Qatari people of Yemeni descent
Place of birth missing (living people)
Qatar Stars League players
Qatari Second Division players
Association football fullbacks